Geoffrey Scott "Geoff" Cameron (born July 11, 1985) is an American professional soccer player who plays as a defender.

Cameron began playing college soccer with the West Virginia Mountaineers and the Rhode Island Rams, as well as USL Premier Development League side Rhode Island Stingrays, before being drafted by Major League Soccer club Houston Dynamo in 2008. After an impressive second season in professional soccer Cameron was named as MLS Best XI in 2009 and helped Houston reach the final of the MLS Cup in 2011 as they lost 1–0 to the LA Galaxy. In July 2012 he joined English Premier League side Stoke City. Cameron spent six seasons with the Potters making 186 appearances before joining Queens Park Rangers in June 2018. Cameron spent three years at QPR before moving to FC Cincinnati in May 2021.

Club career

Early career
Cameron was born in Attleboro, Massachusetts and played youth soccer for Bayside United. He attended Attleboro High School and Providence Country Day School before choosing West Virginia University for college. After making 28 starts in two seasons at  West Virginia Mountaineers, Cameron transferred to the University of Rhode Island for his junior and senior years. Cameron was an immediate starter and helped the Rhode Island Rams beat the Rutgers Scarlet Knights in the 2006 NCAA tournament, scoring in a shootout. As a senior in 2007, Cameron was named midfielder of the Year in the Atlantic 10 Conference and was a first-team all-Mid Atlantic Region selection. During his college years, Cameron also played for Rhode Island Stingrays in the USL Premier Development League where he played 33 times in two seasons scoring eight goals.

Houston Dynamo
Cameron was drafted by the Houston Dynamo in the third round (42nd overall) in the 2008 MLS SuperDraft. He made his professional debut on March 29, 2008, coming on as a substitute in a 3–0 defeat against the New England Revolution. In his first home appearance, on April 6, he scored a last-minute goal to help the Dynamo to a 3–3 draw with FC Dallas. He became a regular substitute and sometimes starter for the Dynamo by mid-season.

On October 31, 2008, it was announced that Cameron was a finalist for MLS Rookie of the Year along with Sean Franklin and Kheli Dube. Cameron played a key role for Houston in the CONCACAF Champions League and North American SuperLiga in 2008 and ended his debut season with 32 appearances, as the Dynamo reached the 2008 MLS Cup Playoffs but lost to New York Red Bulls in the semi-final. During the season Cameron also played for the reserves, helping them to win the MLS Reserve League.

Cameron became a regular for Houston in the 2009 season playing mostly at center-back. He missed just one match in the regular season as Houston again made the play-offs. They edged past Seattle Sounders 1–0 before losing 2–0 to Los Angeles Galaxy in the Western Conference final. Cameron was selected for the 2009 MLS All-Star Game in Sandy, Utah, and he played all 90 minutes in the 1–1 draw with English Premier League side Everton. Cameron was also named in the MLS Best XI for the 2009 season.

During the 2010 season, Cameron suffered a knee injury that kept him out for half of the season. He returned in August after undergoing knee surgery, and scored a 70th-minute header from a free kick by Brad Davis against D.C. United in the Dynamo's 3–1 win on September 25. His was restricted to 17 appearances in the 2010 season. Houston had a poor campaign and finished in seventh position.

In the 2011 season, Cameron returned to the squad as Houston experienced a much better campaign, qualifying for the play-offs after finishing in second position. After beating Philadelphia Union over two legs, they defeated Sporting Kansas City 2–0 to reach the final of the MLS Cup against the Los Angeles Galaxy. Cameron played the full 90 minutes as Houston lost 1–0. Cameron's performances during the season saw him named in the 2011 MLS All-Star Game against Manchester United where the MLS All-Stars lost 4–0. Cameron played 15 games in the 2012 season before moving to England in the summer of 2012.

Stoke City
Cameron agreed to join English Premier League club Stoke City on July 25, 2012, with the deal subject to a successful work permit appeal, which was granted on August 8. He played in his first match for Stoke in a 1–1 draw with German side SpVgg Greuther Fürth in a pre-season friendly. He missed the opening match of the season away at Reading due to visa issues. He made his Premier League debut in a 0–0 draw against Arsenal on August 26, 2012. He has impressed since his arrival in England and has begun to play at right back, a position which Cameron is enjoying learning about. He also described playing in the Premier League as "pretty special". Cameron played 38 times for Stoke in 2012–13 as they finished in 13th position in the Premier League. After the season finished Cameron admitted that towards the end of the season he began to struggle with fatigue after playing competitive soccer for 18 straight months.

At the end of the season Tony Pulis left by mutual agreement and was replaced by Mark Hughes. Cameron stated that he wanted to try and impress Hughes at center-back. Cameron remained at right-back and scored his first goal for Stoke on September 22, 2013, in a 3–1 defeat against Arsenal. Cameron continued to be a key player in his attacking full-back role under Hughes and provided an assist for Peter Crouch in a 2–1 win over Aston Villa on December 21, 2013. Cameron scored a rare goal on March 23, 2014, in a 4–1 win at Aston Villa. Cameron played 41 times for Stoke in 2013–14 as they finished in 9th position in the Premier League.

Cameron's start to the 2014–15 season was disrupted by a hernia injury which required surgery. After recovering from his injury Cameron told manager Mark Hughes that he wants to begin playing in midfield. Despite this Cameron continued to compete with Phil Bardsley for the right back position as the season progressed. He was sent-off for the first time in English soccer after conceding a penalty in a 4–1 FA Cup defeat away at Blackburn Rovers in February 2015. Cameron signed a new three-year contract with Stoke on May 24, 2015. Cameron played 31 times for Stoke in 2014–15 as the Potters finished in 9th position for a second season running and they ended the campaign with a 6–1 victory against Liverpool. Cameron played 34 times in 2015–16 as Stoke again finished in ninth position.

Stoke made a poor start to the 2016–17 season, failing to win a match until October with back-to-back wins over Hull City and Sunderland with Cameron impressing in midfield. However, in that Hull match Cameron suffered a knee ligament injury which ruled him out until February 2017. Cameron made 21 appearances in 2016–17, as Stoke finished in 13th position. He signed a two-year contract extension in May 2017. Cameron again made 21 appearances in 2017–18 as Stoke suffered relegation to the EFL Championship.

Queens Park Rangers
Cameron joined Queens Park Rangers on loan for the 2018–19 season after not being part of Gary Rowett's plans. Cameron played 19 times for Rangers scoring once in a 1–1 draw against Derby County on October 6, 2018.  Cameron made his move to Queens Park Rangers permanent on July 25, 2019. Cameron was named captain of the QPR ahead of the 2020–21 season.

On May 5, 2021, Cameron announced he will depart the club returning to his native America after making 90 appearances and scoring twice for QPR.

FC Cincinnati
On May 13, 2021, Cameron returned to Major League Soccer and signed with FC Cincinnati on contract through the 2022 season with an additional option year. He made his debut for the club on May 16 against Inter Miami, starting in the 3–2 defeat. Cameron was released by Cincinnati following their 2022 season.

International career

Cameron received his first call up to train with the senior United States national team in January 2009, but he was injured during the first week and was unable to play in the team's friendly against Sweden. He participated again in training with the team in Carson, California in January 2010, leading up to a friendly match against Honduras. Cameron did not play in that match, but he was again called into camp for the February 24, 2010, game against El Salvador in Tampa, Florida. He appeared as a substitute in the 86th minute for Robbie Rogers, recording his first cap for the national side, nearly scoring on a blazing strike that narrowly went over the bar. In December 2011, Cameron was called up to coach Jürgen Klinsmann's camp. On January 21, 2012, he went 90 minutes in a friendly against Venezuela. Cameron scored his goal for the national team on May, 29 in a 4–2 defeat against Belgium.

Cameron was a part of the United States national team during the 2014 FIFA World Cup. He started as central defender during the team's first two group stage games against Ghana and Portugal. He was benched for the third game against Germany. In the Round of 16 defeat against Belgium, Cameron started in central midfield.

Cameron sat out the 2015 CONCACAF Gold Cup due to a combination of injury and wanting to be with his club for preseason. Cameron started in every game at the Copa América Centenario in central defense alongside Hertha BSC's John Brooks.

Style of play

A versatile player who is currently featured as center back but can also play as a right back or defensive midfielder. Cameron is known for his aerial ability, strength, athleticism and composure on the ball.

Personal life
During his time at Houston Dynamo, Cameron took part in a series of community service efforts to raise money for local charitable organizations in 2011 and 2012. The 20 for 20 campaign was started in September 2011 when Cameron, who wore the No. 20 jersey in Houston, announced a goal to raise a total of $20,000 for the Fisher House and Ronald McDonald House of Houston. In March 2012, Cameron and the Dynamo announced the return of the 20 for 20 campaign with the same initial goal of $20,000, with proceeds going to the Leukemia & Lymphoma Society. Growing up Cameron supported English side Manchester United and Italian side Juventus. Since living in England Cameron has participated in local community work,  

Cameron was one of the few sportspeople who expressed support for then President Donald Trump's Executive Order 13769, which put a 90-day immigration freeze on several nations and suspended activity on the United States Refugee Admissions Program.

Career statistics

Club

International

Honors
Houston Dynamo
 MLS Cup runner-up: 2011
 Major League Soccer Eastern Conference Champion: 2011

Individual
 Atlantic 10 Conference Midfielder of the Year: 2007
 Dynamo Newcomer of the Year: 2008
 MLS Best XI: 2009
 Dynamo Defender of the Year: 2009
 Major League Soccer All-Star Game: 2009, 2011

References

External links

1985 births
Living people
American soccer players
American expatriate soccer players
American expatriate sportspeople in England
United States men's international soccer players
Association football midfielders
West Virginia Mountaineers men's soccer players
Rhode Island Stingrays players
Rhode Island Rams men's soccer players
Houston Dynamo FC players
Stoke City F.C. players
Queens Park Rangers F.C. players
FC Cincinnati players
Soccer players from Massachusetts
People from Attleboro, Massachusetts
Expatriate footballers in England
Houston Dynamo FC draft picks
USL League Two players
Major League Soccer players
Major League Soccer All-Stars
Premier League players
2014 FIFA World Cup players
Copa América Centenario players
English Football League players
Association football defenders